Bob Tyrrell (born November 4, 1962) is an American tattoo artist. He is known for his black-and-gray tattooing style.

Biography
Bob Tyrrell was born on November 4, 1962 in Detroit, Michigan. His father was an artist. He began tattooing in his early 30s. He apprenticed at Eternal Tattoos, a tattoo shop in Michigan.

He has been featured in LA Ink and London Ink. He became known for tattooing Kid Rock's back. In 2012, he participated as a jury member in the first Chaudesaigues Award, an award that recognizes the career and artwork of tattoo artists. In that year, he appeared on an episode of Ink Master as a special guest judge.

Filmography

DVDs
 Method to My Madness (2014)
 Hair of the Dog (2017)

References

Further reading

External links
 Official website
 

American tattoo artists
People from Michigan
Living people
1962 births